Negotinthia hoplisiformis is a moth of the family Sesiidae. It is found in Greece, Turkey and Iran.

The wingspan is about 21 mm.

The larvae feed on Sanguisorba minor.

References

Moths described in 1864
Sesiidae
Moths of Europe
Moths of Asia